The 2019 Latvian Higher League , known as the Optibet Virslīga for sponsorship reasons, was the 28th season of top-tier football in Latvia. The season began on 9 March 2019 and ended on 9 November 2019.

Riga were the defending champions from the previous season.

Teams

All eight clubs from the previous season remained in the league with Daugavpils joining the league as champions of 1.Liga 2018.

League table

Results
Each club played the other eight clubs home-and-away twice, for a total of 32 matches each.

Relegation play-offs
The ninth-placed team from the 2019 Higher League played the runners-up of the 2019 Latvian First League in a two-legged play-off on 13–16 November 2019. The winner, METTA/LU, will remain in the Latvian Higher League.

Statistics

Top scorers

References

External links
 

Latvian Higher League seasons
1
Latvia
Latvia